S. Pressly Coker House is a historic home located at Hartsville, Darlington County, South Carolina.  It was built in 1917, it is a blending of elements of both the Shingle Style and Colonial Revival styles, with the form and massing of the bungalow. It is a two-story, three bay, rectangular, shingle-clad residence.  It features an engaged one-story portico which extends and wraps to form a porte-cochère. It was the home of S. Pressly Coker (1887-1953), prominent Hartsville agriculturalist and businessman who was a plant breeder with the Coker Pedigreed Seed Company and later founder and president of the Humphrey-Coker Seed Company and the Hygeia Dairy.

It was listed on the National Register of Historic Places in 1994.

References

Houses on the National Register of Historic Places in South Carolina
Colonial Revival architecture in South Carolina
Houses completed in 1917
Houses in Hartsville, South Carolina
National Register of Historic Places in Darlington County, South Carolina